Puppet Strings is a 2007 album by American band The High Court.

Track listing
"Puppet Strings"	
"2 Much Love for 1 Woman"
"The Refresher Course"
"Whisper to the Clouds"
"In Bambi's Eyes"
"Heaven On The Horizon"
"Alien"
"Payback"
"She'll Never Know"
"After the Climax"
"Like a Ghost"
"Down in Flames"

References

2007 albums
The High Court (band) albums